The swap test is a procedure in quantum computation that is used to check how much two quantum states differ, appearing first in the work of Barenco et al.
and later rediscovered by Harry Buhrman, Richard Cleve, John Watrous, and Ronald de Wolf. It appears commonly in quantum machine learning, and is a circuit used for proofs-of-concept in implementations of quantum computers.

This allows one to, for example, estimate the squared inner product between the two states, to  additive error by taking the average over  runs of the swap test. This requires  copies of the input states. The squared inner product roughly measures "overlap" between the two states, and can be used in linear-algebraic applications, including clustering quantum states.

Explanation of the circuit

The controlled SWAP gate transforms the state into . The second Hadamard gate results in 

The measurement gate on the first qubit ensures that it's 0 with a probability of

when measured. If the states are equal , then the probability that 0 is measured is 1.

 Inputs P copies each of the n qubits quantum states  and 
 Output An estimate of 
 
 for j ranging from 1 to P:
     initialize an ancilla qubit A in state 
     apply a Hadamard gate to the ancilla qubit A
     for i ranging from 1 to n: 
     apply a Hadamard gate to the ancilla qubit A
     measure A in the  basis and record the measurement ''Mj as either a 0 or 1
 compute .
 return  as our estimate of

References

Quantum algorithms